St. Elizabeth Healthcare (Kentucky) is the system of Roman Catholic hospitals covering Northern Kentucky.  The first hospital was founded in 1861 in Covington, under the patronage of St. Elizabeth of Hungary.  The recent acquisition of the St. Luke Hospitals expanded the system to cover all of northern Kentucky.   Currently there are seven medical centers which are located in
 Covington
 Edgewood
 Fort Thomas - formerly St. Luke East
 Florence - formerly St. Luke West
 Williamstown
 Falmouth
 Aurora

In addition, the St. Elizabeth Physicians network contains many of the doctors and specialists located throughout the region.

References

External links
 St. Elizabeth Healthcare Homepage
 St. Elizabeth Physicians Homepage

Catholic Church in Kentucky
Healthcare in Kentucky
1861 establishments in Kentucky
Hospital networks in the United States